KOWB (1290 AM) is a radio station broadcasting a news talk information format licensed to operate in Laramie, Wyoming, United States. The station is currently owned by Townsquare Media and features programming from Fox News Radio, Fox Sports Radio, Compass Media Networks, and Premiere Networks.

KOWB is the AM flagship for Wyoming Cowboys football and basketball; games are simulcast on sister station KCGY.

History

The station went on the air as KOWB. 

The station won the station of the year award from the Wyoming Association of Broadcasters in 2008.

References

External links
KOWB official website

News and talk radio stations in the United States
OWB
Townsquare Media radio stations